Yannis Katsafados (9 May 1935 – 2 March 2020) was a Greek lawyer and politician who served as both MP and MEP.

References

1935 births
2020 deaths
20th-century Greek politicians
Politicians from Piraeus
MEPs for Greece 1981–1984
New Democracy (Greece) MEPs
Panteion University alumni